Scot McFadyen is a Canadian film director, producer and music supervisor whose work focuses on the subculture of heavy metal.  He co-owns Toronto-based production company Banger Films with Sam Dunn.

Films

Metal: A Headbanger's Journey
McFadyen's first film, co-directed with Dunn and Jessica Wise, was released in 2005. The film follows Dunn on a journey to document the origins, culture and appeal of heavy metal.  It also explores the themes of heavy metal: violence, death, religion and Satanism, gender and sexuality.

Global Metal
Released in 2008, McFadyen and Dunn co-directed a new film, Global Metal.  In the film, McFadyen and Dunn set out to discover how the West’s most maligned musical genre — heavy metal — has impacted the world’s cultures beyond Europe and North America.  The film follows metal fan, host and anthropologist Sam Dunn on a whirlwind journey through Asia, South America and the Middle East as he explores the underbelly of the world’s emerging extreme music scenes — from Indonesian death metal to Israeli Oriental metal and Chinese black metal to Iranian thrash metal, etc.  The film reveals a worldwide community of metalheads who are not only absorbing metal from the West, but are also transforming it and creating a new form of cultural expression in societies dominated by conflict, corruption and mass consumerism.

Iron Maiden: Flight 666
McFadyen and Dunn co-wrote and co-directed the 2009 documentary Iron Maiden: Flight 666.  The film chronicles the band's 2008 tour in which a converted Boeing 757 was flown from country to country by vocalist Bruce Dickinson.

Rush: Beyond The Lighted Stage
In 2009, McFadyen and Dunn started working on a documentary about progressive metal band Rush. The film premiered at the 2010 Tribeca Film Festival in New York on April 29, winning the festival's Audience Award.

Filmography

References

External links

Banger Films official site
IRON MAIDEN: FLIGHT 666 - THE MOVIE
Metal: A Headbanger's Journey official site
Global Metal official site
Rush: The Documentary page on The Internet Movie Database

Film directors from Toronto
Canadian documentary film producers
Canadian people of Scottish descent
Living people
Canadian documentary film directors
Directors of Genie and Canadian Screen Award winners for Best Documentary Film
Year of birth missing (living people)